Montalbano Jonico is a town and comune in the province of Matera, in the Southern Italian region of Basilicata.

Geography data
Montalbano Jonico is located in the south-west part of the province, between the rivers Cavone and Agri. The town is 72 kilometres from Matera and 118 kilometres from Potenza.

References

Cities and towns in Basilicata